Efraín Sánchez Hidalgo (April 29, 1918 – 1974) was an educator, college professor and a former Puerto Rico Secretary of Education.

Early day and military service
He was born in Moca, Puerto Rico on April 29, 1918. His parents were Zenón Sánchez Avilés and Pelegrina Hidalgo Pérez. He studied at the Elementary School in Moca and High School in Aguadilla. Served in the United States Army from 1941 to 1946, assigned to the 65th Infantry Regiment. In the Maritime Alps as a Captain he commanded in World War II the first all-Puerto Rican military unit that engaged in combat with the enemy. He was decorated with a Bronze Star Medal for he's duty in combat.

Education career
He obtained a Bachelor of Arts in education Magna Laude, and a PhD in psychology at the Columbia University. He devotes his life to education, dedicating 31 1/2 years to teaching. In his "role" as a professor at the University of Puerto Rico and other universities outside of Puerto Rico, Dr. Sánchez Hidalgo taught, among others, the following courses: Educational Psychology, Educational Sociology, Child Psychology, Adolescent Psychology, and Old Age Psychology. In 1971 he was selected by Outstanding Educators of America as a Distinguished Educator. Was appointed Secretary of Education of Puerto Rico from 1957 til 1960. He retired from the university classrooms on February 4, 1974.

Legacy
A middle school in Moca, Puerto Rico was named after him.

References

1918 births
1974 deaths
Columbia University alumni
People from Moca, Puerto Rico
Puerto Rican educators
Puerto Rican Army personnel
Secretaries of Education of Puerto Rico
University of Puerto Rico faculty
United States Army personnel of World War II
United States Army officers